Walt Disney's Timeless Tales is a series of DVDs by Walt Disney Home Entertainment. Each release features around one-hour of Disney animated short films featuring classic fairy tale adaptations. In contrast to the chronological nature of the Walt Disney Treasures line, each release includes cartoons in no particular order.

The series appeared in two waves of releases: on August 16, 2005, and January 3, 2006.

Releases

Wave one
The first wave of two releases was on August 16, 2005.

Volume One
Three Little Pigs (1933)
The Tortoise and the Hare (1935)
The Grasshopper and the Ants (1934)
The Pied Piper (1933)
The Prince and the Pauper (1990)

Volume Two
The Wind in the Willows (1949)
The Ugly Duckling (1939)
Ferdinand the Bull (1938)
The Country Cousin (1936)

Wave two
The second wave of two releases was on January 3, 2006.

Volume Three
Casey at the Bat (1946)
Little Hiawatha (1937)
The Wise Little Hen (1934)
The Golden Touch (1935)
Morris the Midget Moose (1950)
Ben and Me (1953)

References
http://catalog.colapl.org/uhtbin/cgisirsi/qgglCwyOOC/LHQ/242380051/9
http://catalog.colapl.org/uhtbin/cgisirsi/kXJ7jKUsBU/LHQ/242380051/13
http://catalog.colapl.org/uhtbin/cgisirsi/BDSSEtwzlu/LHQ/242380051/13

External links 

 

Disney animated short films
Home video lines
Disney home video releases
Short film compilations